Virginia's 53rd House of Delegates district elects one of 100 seats in the Virginia House of Delegates, the lower house of the state's bicameral legislature. 40,039 of its voters live in Fairfax County and 9,322 of its voters live in Falls Church. In 2017, incumbent Democrat Marcus Simon was challenged by independent Mike Casey.

References

Virginia House of Delegates districts
Government in Fairfax County, Virginia
Falls Church, Virginia